Lewin Brzeski  is a historic town situated in Brzeg County, Opole Voivodeship, southwestern Poland. The total population of Lewin Brzeski was estimated at 5,736 inhabitants in 2019.

History
Located along the medieval trade routes from Silesia to Hungary, by the Amber Road and the Eastern Neisse river, the town of Lewin first developed in the Middle Ages as a market town, located within the Piast-ruled Kingdom of Poland and as a result of the fragmentation of Poland it became part of the duchies of Opole, Brzeg and Legnica. It is first mentioned in a contract from 1257, when a monastery run by the Knights Hospitaller in Łosiów purchased a mill near the town. Its name is of Old Polish origin and refers to hunting.  As early as the mid-13th century the city had received Magdeburg town rights, which granted the town a certain amount of autonomy. The town was built around a rectangular marketplace, and surrounded by a rampart with a palisade with a ditch below it that could, if necessary, through the opening of a lock could be filled with water from the Eastern Neisse. In addition, there were four city gates. In 1333 the town was granted new rights and privileges, such as the brewing of beer and the holding of Wednesday markets, by Duke Bolesław III the Generous. Lewin switched between the duchies of Legnica and Brzeg and remained under the rule of the Piast dynasty until 1675, although it fell under the suzerainty of the Bohemian (Czech) Crown in 1329, Hungary in 1469, and again Bohemia in 1490, then ruled by the Jagiellonian dynasty until 1526 and the House of Habsburg afterwards.

The 16th century brought an economic boom to the city. Since 1592 yearly fairs were organized with the permission of the duke of Brzeg. After the Reformation the town became mainly Protestant, and the Catholic parish was disbanded. During the Thirty Years' War the town was looted, burned, and struck by the Plague. After the dissolution of the Duchy of Legnica in 1675, it was incorporated into the Habsburg monarchy.

In 1742, under the Germanized name Löwen, it became part of Prussia, by then a town of almost 700 people. Several town fires burned the city, the most devastating in 1829, which destroyed the wooden buildings completely and ushered in a fundamental reconstruction of the city. The city was rebuilt with stone buildings, such as the neoclassical Town Hall built in 1837 at the Market Square. In 1846 Löwen was attached to the Upper Silesian Railway, which brought a revival of the industry to the city. In 1866 a metal factory was founded, which produced at first agricultural equipment, then screws, and, much later, finally tape recorders. Other industries included a brick factory, a roof and floor tile factory and a mill. In 1866 the Catholic parish was re-established, though the St. Mary's Church was not built until the early 20th century. In 1901 the village of Fröbeln, which had a sugar factory since 1882 and a population of 554 inhabitants in 1885. Administratively, Löwen was located in Landkreis Brieg, and the seat of its own local court. The old, dilapidated bridge over the Neisse was replaced in 1913 by a new steel bridge.

During World War II the Germans brought hundreds of forced labourers to the town, mostly Poles, but also Russians, Ukrainians, the French, Jews and Serbs, both civilians and prisoners of war. In the final stages of World War II, in January 1945, the Germans evacuated most of the population, leaving only the elderly in the town, and recruited many inhabitants into the Volkssturm. On 4 February 1945 the town was overtaken by the Red Army, which plundered it afterwards.

Following the flight and expulsion of Germans during and after World War II, the town was transferred to Polish control and its historic name Lewin was restored, with the adjective Brzeski added after the nearby city of Brzeg. It was repopulated by Poles, some of them expelled from former eastern Poland annexed by the Soviet Union, in particular from pre-war southeastern Polish regions Stanisławów and Lwów. It was first administered as part of Wroclaw Voivodeship and in 1950 the city was moved to the Opole Voivodeship, where it has remained despite the administrative reforms of 1999. In the years 1950–1953 a secret anti-communist organization Podziemny Orzeł Wolności ("Underground Eagle of Freedom") operated in the town. Its co-founder, Mieczysław Józefczyk, was awarded the Knight's Cross of the Order of Polonia Restituta, one of the highest Polish decorations, in 2017.

A monument of Pope John Paul II was unveiled in Lewin Brzeski in 2014.

Coat of arms
The coat of arms of Lewin was adopted on 18 June 1998 and was based on a seal from the year 1333. It shows a golden lion bordered by three hills on a blue background. The lion recalls the old German name Löwen, which means "lions".

Demography

Population pyramid of the (female to male) population of Lewin Brzeski in 2014:.

Economy

Lewin Brzeski's economy is in large dependent on the local agricultural sector. The largest industry in the locality is the sugar mill "Wróblin". Surrounding the town there are five former gravel pits, now infilled by water, are a popular attraction for locals and people in the region alike. The town and its vicinity is home to numerous tourist attractions.

Transport
Lewin Brzeski is located on the Voivodeship Road  (northbound to Skorogoszcz and the National Road ; southbound towards Przylesie, where the road joins the Voivodeship Road , northbound towards Brzeg and southbound towards the  A4 Motorway then on). The interchange to the  Motorway (Węzeł Przylesie) is located 20 km west of Lewin Brzeski.

Lewin Brzeski lies on the main railway artery between Wrocław and Katowice/Lubliniec, with the town being served by Lewin Brzeski railway station.

Climate

Notable people

 Carl von Plotho (1780–1820), Prussian Lieutenant colonel and military historian.
 Gustav Hellmann (1854–1939), German meteorologist.
  (1920–2014), Polish Lieutenant colonel, participant in the 1939 defensive war
  (1922–1968), Polish military officer, member of the Home Army and cichociemni
  (born 1947), former Polish footballer

Twin towns – sister cities
See twin towns of Gmina Lewin Brzeski.

See also
Flag of Lewin Brzeski

References

External links
Official town webpage
 Jewish Community in Lewin Brzeski on Virtual Shtetl

Cities in Silesia
Cities and towns in Opole Voivodeship
Brzeg County